The 1970 Pacific Coast International Open was a men's tennis tournament played on outdoor hard courts at the Berkeley Tennis Club in Berkeley, California in the United States and was part of the Grand Prix tennis circuit. It was the 82nd edition of the tournament and ran from September 28 through October 4, 1970. Second-seeded Arthur Ashe won the singles title.

Finals

Singles
 Arthur Ashe defeated  Cliff Richey 6–4, 6–2, 6–4

Doubles
 Bob Lutz /  Stan Smith defeated  Roy Barth /  Tom Gorman 6–2, 7–5, 4–6, 6–2

References

External links
 Official website
 ATP tournament profile
 ITF tournament edition details

1970 Grand Prix (tennis)
1970 in American tennis
1970 in sports in California
September 1970 sports events in the United States
October 1970 sports events in the United States
1970